Muqaddimah (مقدمة) or Mukadimah is an Arabic word used to mean "Prologue" or "The Introduction", to introduce a larger work, e.g., a book. Sometimes any preface of a book called muqaddimah too. Muqaddimah may specifically refer to:
 Muqaddimah Ibn Khaldun (Ibn Khaldun's Prolegomena), and early Islamic treatise on world history.
 Muqaddimah Ibn al-Salah (Introduction to the Science of Hadith), early treatise on hadith science.
 Muqaddimah Al-Ajurrumiya, famous treatise on Arabic grammar.
 Mukadimah UUD '45, preamble of Constitution of Indonesia.

See also 
Prolegomena (disambiguation)